Suparawra (the name of an apu, Hispanicized spelling Suparaura) is a  mountain in the Andes of Peru. It is situated in the Ayacucho Region, Parinacochas Province, on the border of the districts of Coracora and Upahuacho. Suparawra lies southwest of Q'illu Urqu.

References 

Mountains of Peru
Mountains of Ayacucho Region